Tango Palace is a solo album by Canadian jazz pianist Paul Bley recorded in 1983 and released on the Italian Soul Note label.

Reception

The AllMusic review by Eugene Chadbourne awarded the album 3 stars, stating: "An alarm mechanism goes off at the sight of another solo album by this artist; the acquisition of a complete collection would surely cause floors to sag. Still, the dapper Paul Bley, pipe alit, will arrive at the studio, and by the end of the day a project is completed, with attention paid to all the details that will make such an album an enjoyable, varied listening experience." The Penguin Guide to Jazz described it as "a mellow solo piano date."

Track listing
All compositions credited to Paul Bley, although "But Beautiful" was composed by Burke & Van Heusen
 "Tango Palace" - 3:40   
 "C.G." - 3:09   
 "Woogie" - 2:22   
 "A.G.B." - 4:08   
 "But Beautiful" - 6:20   
 "Return Love" - 5:31   
 "Bound" - 2:38   
 "Zebra Walk" - 2:55   
 "Please" - 4:50   
 "Explain" - 5:30  
Recorded at Barigozzi Studio in Milano, Italy, on May 21, 1983.

Personnel
 Paul Bley – piano

References

Black Saint/Soul Note albums
Paul Bley albums
Solo piano jazz albums
1985 albums